Jeffry Ned Kahn is a professor of mathematics at Rutgers University notable for his work in combinatorics.

Education
Kahn received his Ph.D. from Ohio State University in 1979 after completing his dissertation under his advisor Dijen K. Ray-Chaudhuri.

Research
In 1980 he showed the importance of the bundle theorem for ovoidal Möbius planes. In 1993, together with Gil Kalai, he disproved Borsuk's conjecture. In 1996 he was awarded the Pólya Prize (SIAM).

Awards and honors
He was an invited speaker at the 1994 International Congress of Mathematicians in Zurich.

In 2012, he was awarded the Fulkerson Prize (jointly with Anders Johansson and Van H. Vu) for determining the threshold of edge density above which a random graph can be covered by disjoint copies of a given smaller graph. Also in 2012, he became a fellow of the American Mathematical Society.

References

Living people
20th-century American mathematicians
21st-century American mathematicians
Combinatorialists
Rutgers University faculty
Fellows of the American Mathematical Society
Year of birth missing (living people)